The X Factor is a Greek and Cypriot television music competition to find new singing talent. The sixth series began airing on Open TV on September 11, 2019.

The judges were Giorgos Theofanous, who returned for his fifth series after a one-series hiatus as judge, former The Voice of Greece coach Melina Aslanidou, former Rising Star judge Christos Mastoras and Athens DeeJay Michael Tsaousopoulos. For the first time the presenter was replaced by Despina Vandi, she was presenting the live shows and the four-chair challenges. Aris Makris was presenting the Backstage at the live shows and also he was on auditions, bootcamps and four-chair challenges.

Giannis Grosis won the competition on December 18, 2019, and he became the fifth boy to win the competition, he received €50,000 and a record deal with Panik Records and Christos Mastoras became the winning mentor for the first time.

Judges and presenters
Giorgos Liagkas, who also hosted the Greek version of The Voice, was rumored to be the host of the show. On June 25, 2018, it was confirmed from Epsilon TV (Open TV now) that Despina Vandi will be the host of Live Shows, replacing Sakis Rouvas. It was rumored that Evelyn Kazatzoglou will be at the Backstage of Live Shows. Evangelia Aravani was rumored that she will be for a third time a backstage host. On the running was also Aris Makris and on February 22 was confirmed that he will be at the Backstage of Auditions, Bootcamp, Four-Chair Challenge and Live Shows.

Several artists were rumored to be part of the judging panel once Open TV announced the show. Fotis Sergoulopoulos was the first to be rumored. Tamta that was in fourth and fifth series was rumored to be again in the show, after some weeks was announced that she will represent Cyprus in the Eurovision Song Contest 2019 and so she can't be this year a judge. It was rumored also that Paola will be in the judging panel. Eleni Foureira, was rumored also but a program on Open TV they told that there was never a proposal in Foureira. On the running were also Antonis Remos, Melina Aslanidou, Konstantinos Argyros, Christos Mastoras and Giorgos Theofanous. On February 18, 2019, Giorgos Theofanous was confirmed to be returning for his fifth series followed by new judges, Melina Aslanidou and Christos Mastoras. On February 20, was confirmed that the fourth judge will be Michael Tsaousopoulos.

Selection process

Judges Auditions
The minimum age to audition was 16. After one series the auditions was again held in front of an audience. Contestants needed three or more 'yeses' from the four judges to progress to Bootcamp. The auditions began on 22 May 2019, in Athens and ended on 12 June 2019, in Thessaloniki.

The Auditions were aired over nine episodes from September 11, 2019, until September 27, 2019.

Bootcamp
Bootcamp took place at «Theater», Hellenic Cosmos Cultural Center from 10 to 11 July 2019. The challenge of bootcamp was to perform in groups of five acts, with a mix of at least three categories in each group, and perform a song from a list. The judges would decide immediately after each performance which of the 110 acts would pass the challenge and which would be eliminated.

At the end of the Bootcamp challenge, the judges discovered which categories they would mentor: Tsaousopoulos was given the Girls, Mastoras was given the Boys, Aslanidou was given Overs, and Theofanous was given the Groups.

Bootcamp was aired on September 27, 2019.

Four-chair challenge
The four-chair challenge took place over the course of three days, from 3 to 5 September 2019, at Kapa Studios 2 Athens. 40 acts faced the four-chair challenge, 10 from each category. The challenge will broadcast on 2, 3, 9 and 10 October.

Key:
 – Contestant was immediately eliminated after performance without given a chair
 – Contestant was given a chair but swapped out later in the competition and eventually eliminated
 – Contestant was given a chair and made the final four of their own category

Contestants
The top 16 acts were confirmed as follows:

Key:
 – Winner
 – Runner-up

Live shows
The contestants were announced after each category performed at Four-chair challenge. There were 16 contestants (4 from each category) this year. The Live Shows were broadcast for 10 weeks from 17 October.

Results summary
Colour key

 Theofanous was not required to vote as there was already a majority.

Live show details

Week 1 (17 October)

Week 2 (24 October)

Judges' votes to eliminate
 Tsaousopoulos: Giannis Antzouris
 Aslanidou: Mary Vassiliadou
 Mastoras: Mary Vassiliadou
 Theofanous: Giannis Antzouris

With the acts in the sing-off receiving two votes each, the result went to deadlock and reverted to the earlier public vote. Mary Vassiliadou was eliminated as the act with the fewest public votes.

Week 3 (31 October)

Judges' votes to eliminate
 Theofanous: Giannis Antzouris
 Aslanidou: AC²
 Mastoras: Giannis Antzouris
 Tsaousopoulos: AC²

With the acts in the sing-off receiving two votes each, the result went to deadlock and reverted to the earlier public vote. Giannis Antzouris was eliminated as the act with the fewest public votes.

Week 4 (7 November)
 Group Performance, in memory of Giorgos Spanos (Top 10): "Anthropoi Monahoi"/"Tha Se Thimamai"/"An M' Agapas"/"San Me Koitas"/"Epidi S' Agapo"/"Fteme Ki Oi Dio"/"Spasmeno Karavi"/"Odos Aristotelous"/"Prosopika"/"Tha Me Thimithis"/"Aspra Karavia"

Judges' votes to eliminate
 Tsaousopoulos: Konstantina Aresti (×2)
 Mastoras: Zoi Misel Bakiri
 Aslanidou: Konstantina Aresti
 Theofanous: Zoi Misel Bakiri

With the acts in the sing-off receiving two votes each, the result went to Tsaousopoulos and he had to choose who should leave his team. Konstantina Aresti was eliminated.

Week 5 (14 November)
 Group Performance (Top 9): "Last Christmas"
 Musical guests: FY: "No IQ"/"Celebrity"/"De me Theloun"

Judges' votes to eliminate
 Theofanous: Lila Trianti
 Aslanidou: Ano Kato
 Mastoras: Ano Kato
 Tsaousopoulos: Lila Trianti

With the acts in the sing-off receiving two votes each, the result went to deadlock and reverted to the earlier public vote. Lila Trianti was eliminated as the act with the fewest public votes.

Week 6 (21 November)

Judges' votes to eliminate
 Tsaousopoulos: Giannis Tergiakis
 Mastoras: Zoi Misel Bakiri
 Aslanidou: Zoi Misel Bakiri
 Theofanous: Giannis Tergiakis

With the acts in the sing-off receiving two votes each, the result went to deadlock and reverted to the earlier public vote. Giannis Tergiakis was eliminated as the act with the fewest public votes.

Week 7 (28 November)
 Group Performance
 Christos Mastoras with Giannis Grosis and Dimitris Papatsakonas: "Kai Ti Zitao"
 Michael Tsaousopoulos with Zoi Misel Bakiri: "Levels"
 Giorgos Theofanous with AC², Ano Kato and Liak and the Cover: "S' Agapo"
 Melina Aslanidou with Konstantinos Stinis: "Poso Se Thelo"
 Musical guests: Melisses: "To Kyma"/"Giati"/ "Ena"/"Ola Moiazoun Kalokairi"

Judges' votes to eliminate
 Tsaousopoulos: AC²
 Theofanous: Zoi Misel Bakiri
 Mastoras: Zoi Misel Bakiri
 Aslanidou: Zoi Misel Bakiri

Week 8 (5 December)
 Opening act: Despina Vandi: "Esto Ligo Akoma"
 Musical guests: Melina Aslanidou: "Eyhi"
 Group Performance: Despina Vandi and Melina Aslanidou: "Agapise Me"/"Hronia Helidonia"/"Vrehei Pali Apopse"/"Ama deite to Feggari"/"Ximeronoi Kyriaki"/"Dos mou T' Athanato Nero"

Judges' votes to eliminate
 Tsaousopoulos: Liak and the Cover
 Mastoras: Liak and the Cover
 Aslanidou: Liak and the Cover
 Theofanous was not required to vote as there was already a majority.

Week 9: Semi-Final (11 December)
Musical guests: Dimitris Basis and Christos Mastoras: "Ena Lepto"
Musical guests: Tamta: "Replay"/"Sex With Your Ex"/"Senorita"

Judges' votes to send through to the final
 Theofanous: AC²
 Aslanidou: Konstantinos Stinis
 Tsaousopoulos: AC²
 Mastoras: Konstantinos Stinis

With the acts in the sing-off receiving two votes each, the result went to deadlock and reverted to the earlier public vote. Konstantinos Stinis was eliminated as the act with the fewest public votes.

Week 10: Final (18 December)
 Opening act: Konstantinos Stinis, Giannis Tergiakis and Giorgos Papanastasiou: "Santa Claus Is Comin' to Town", Zoi Misel Bakiri, Konstantina Aresti, Mary Vassiliadou and Lila Trianti: "All I Want for Christmas Is You"
 Group Performance: Aris Makris, Mary Vassiliadou, Lila Trianti, Zoi Misel Bakiri, Konstantina Aresti, Konstantinos Stinis, Giannis Tergiakis, Ano Kato and Giorgos Papanastasiou: "Do They Know It's Christmas?"
 Group Performance: Giorgos Theofanous, Melina Aslanidou, Christos Mastoras and Despina Vandi and with Aris Makris and some finalists of The X Factor Greece 6: "Adikrista"/"Den Teleiosame"/"Ela na me Teleioseis"/"Kokkini Grammi"/"Tha 'Prepe"/"Thymos"/"Misise Me"/"Pou na 'sai"/"Feggari Mou"/"Ekrypsa to Prosopo mou"/"Paliokairos"/"To Kyma"/"Noima"/"O Dikos mou o Dromos"/"De Milame"/"Den ehei Sidera i Kardia sou"/"Tremo"/"Hamogelase"/"S' Agapo"

References 

Greece 06
2019 Greek television seasons